Ruslan Yeremenko (born 31 July 1978) is a Ukrainian pole vaulter.

His personal best jump is 5.70 metres, achieved in July 2001 in Kyiv. He had 5.84 metres on the indoor track, achieved in January 2005 in Stuttgart.

Achievements

References

1978 births
Living people
Ukrainian male pole vaulters
Athletes (track and field) at the 2004 Summer Olympics
Olympic athletes of Ukraine